Quercus edwardsiae is a species of oak endemic to northeastern Mexico.

Description
It is closely related to  Quercus porphyrogenita.

Range and habitat
Quercus edwardsiae is endemic to the Sierra de Lampazos of Nuevo León state of northeastern Mexico, in the municipalities of Lampazos and Bustamante. The Sierra de Lampazos is a northern outlier of the Sierra Madre Oriental.

The species is found in oak-forested canyons between 522 and 700 meters elevation. It grows as isolated trees among other oaks.

Conservation
Little is known about the population of the species. Its habitat is mostly located on private land.

References

Endemic oaks of Mexico
Flora of the Sierra Madre Oriental
Trees of Nuevo León
edwardsiae
Plants described in 1942
Trees of Northeastern Mexico